Empress dowager (also dowager empress or empress mother) is the English language translation of the title given to the mother or widow of a Chinese, Japanese, Korean, or Vietnamese emperor in the Chinese cultural sphere.

The title was also given occasionally to another woman of the same generation, while a woman from the previous generation was sometimes given the title of grand empress dowager. Numerous empress dowagers held regency during the reign of underage emperors.  Many of the most prominent empress dowagers also extended their control for long periods after the emperor was old enough to govern.  This was a source of political turmoil according to the traditional view of Chinese history.

The title dowager empress was given to the wife of a deceased emperor of Russia or Holy Roman emperor.

By country
For grand empresses dowager, visit grand empress dowager.

East Asia

Chinese empresses dowager
 Han dynasty
 Empress Dowager Lü (241-180 BC), empress consort of Emperor Gaozu of Han (256-195 BC, r. 202-195 BC)
 Empress Dowager Dou
 Empress Dowager Wang
 Empress Dowager Deng
 Empress Dowager Liang (116-150), empress to Emperor Shun of Han (115-144, r. 125-144)
 Empress Dowager He (d. 189), second empress consort of Emperor Ling of Han (156-189, r. 168-189)

 Jin dynasty
 Empress Wenming (217-268), wife of Sima Zhao (211-265)

 Northern Wei dynasty
 Empress Dowager Feng
 Empress Dowager Hu, (d. 528), concubine of Emperor Xuanwu (483-515, r. 499-515)

 Liu Song dynasty
 Empress Dowager Xiao Wenshou (343-423), stepmother of Emperor Wu of Liu Song (363-422, r. 420-422)

 Tang dynasty
 Empress Dowager Wu, more commonly known as Wu Zetian
 Empress Dowager Xiao
 Empress Dowager He

 Liao dynasty
 Empress Dowager Xiao (d. 951?), concubine of Yelü Bei
 Empress Dowager Chengtian
 Empress Dowager Xiao Noujin (980-1057), concubine of Emperor Shengzong

 Song dynasty
 Empress Dowager Xie (1210-1283), empress consort of Emperor Lizong of Song

 Yuan dynasty
 Empress Gi (1315-1369), one of the primary empresses of Toghon Temur

 Qing dynasty
 Empress Dowager Xiaoduanwen (1599-1649), consort of Hong Taiji (1592-1643), second Khan of the Later Jin dynasty (r. 1626-1636) and first Emperor of the Qin dynasty (r. 1636-1643)
 Empress Dowager Xiaozhuang (1613-1688), consort of Hong Taiji
 Empress Dowager Renxian  (1641-1718)
 Empress Dowager Cihe
 Empress Dowager Chongqing 
 Empress Dowager Ci'an
 Empress Dowager Cixi, de facto ruler of the Qing dynasty for 40 years
 Empress Dowager Longyu (1868-1913), wife and empress consort of Zaitian, the Guangxu Emperor, abdicated on behalf of Puyi

Japanese empress dowager

In the complex organization of the Japanese Imperial Court, the title of "empress dowager" does not automatically devolve to the principal consort of an Emperor who has died. The title "Kōtaigō" can only be bestowed or granted by the Emperor who will have acceded to the Chrysanthemum Throne.

The following were among the individuals who were granted this imperial title:
 , widow of Emperor Kōkaku
 , widow of Emperor Kōmei
 , widow of Emperor Meiji
 , widow of Emperor Taishō
 , widow of Emperor Shōwa

Korean empress dowager

 Empress dowager Myeongheon (1831–1903), wife and widow of Heonjong of Joseon.

Europe

Holy Roman dowager empresses

Eleonora Gonzaga was empress dowager from 1657–1686.

Although never referred to as a dowager, Empress Matilda was controversially the Holy Roman Empress and continued to be referred to as "empress" long after the death of her first husband Henry V, and her subsequent remarriage. Despite having abandoned the throne of Sicily for her son Frederick II, Empress Constance widow of Henry VI retained her title as empress dowager till her death.

Russian dowager empresses
Dowager empresses of Russia held precedence over the empress consort. This was occasionally a source of tension. For example, when Paul I was assassinated, Dowager Empress Maria Feodorovna (Sophie Dorothea of Württemberg), for whom this tradition was started, often took the arm of her son Tsar Alexander I at court functions and ceremonies while his wife Empress Elizabeth Alexeievna (Louise of Baden) walked behind, which caused resentment on the part of the young empress. The same thing happened decades later when Emperor Alexander III died, and the Dowager Empress Maria Feodorovna (Dagmar of Denmark) held precedence over Empress Alexandra Fyodorovna (Alix of Hesse), which put an enormous strain on their already tense relationship. The power struggle culminated when the Dowager Empress refused to hand over certain jewels traditionally associated with the Empress Consort.

There have been four dowager empresses in Russia:
 Empress Maria Feodorovna (Sophie Dorothea of Württemberg) (1759-1828) Empress Consort of Paul I of Russia (r. 1796-1801)
 Empress Elizabeth Alexeievna (Louise of Baden) (1779-1826) Empress Consort of Alexander I of Russia (r. 1801-1825)
 Empress Alexandra Feodorovna (Charlotte of Prussia) (1798-1860) Empress Consort of Nicholas I of Russia (r. 1825-1855)
 Empress Maria Feodorovna (Dagmar of Denmark) (1847-1928) Empress Consort of Alexander III of Russia (r. 1881-1894)

Empress Elizabeth Alexeievna was briefly and concurrently, along with her mother in-law Dowager Empress Maria Feodorovna, a Dowager empress. She is therefore often forgotten as an Dowager Empress.

South Asia

Indian empresses dowager 
Queen-Empress Victoria (1819–1901, r. 1837–1901) was widowed in 1861, before her accession as Queen-Empress of India. Her son, her grandson and her great-grandson all died before their wives, and their widows were known as empresses dowager in this Indian context.  Had George VI, the last Emperor of India, died before the independence of India was proclaimed in 1947, his widow would have been known as the dowager empress of India.  However, George VI did not die until 1952, some years after India's formal independence and the renunciation of the title Emperor of India by the British monarch (which took place formally in 1948).

 Queen-Empress Alexandra (d. 20 Nov. 1925), widow of King-Emperor Edward VII (r. 1901–1910)
 Queen-Empress Mary (d. 24 Mar. 1953), widow of King-Emperor George V (r. 1910–1936)
 Queen-Empress Elizabeth (d. 30 Mar. 2002), widow of King-Emperor George VI (r. 1936–1947)

Southeast Asia

Vietnamese empresses dowager

 Đinh-Early Lê dynasties
 Empress Dowager Dương Vân Nga (952–1000): In 979, her husband Emperor Đinh Bộ Lĩnh died after an assassination, her son Prince Đinh Toàn ascended to the throne, she became empress dowager and handled all political matters. But later she dethroned her son and ceded the throne to Lê Đại Hành and married him. Once again she took the title of empress consort. Because she was an empress twice with two different emperors, she is called "Hoàng hậu hai triều" (Two-dynasty Empress).
 Lý dynasty
 Empress Dowager Thượng Dương (?–1073): While she could not give birth to any sons, her husband's concubine Lady Ỷ Lan gave birth to a prince, called Lý Càn Đức. After husband's death, she became empress dowager and declared that she will "buông rèm nhiếp chính" (regent) for the new seven-year-old emperor, but the mother of the new emperor Lady Dowager Ỷ Lan vehemently opposed and forced her to the death. Her tenure of being an empress dowager is one year.
 Empress Dowager Ỷ Lan (c. 1044–1117): After dethroning and killing the empress dowager, she became empress dowager and kept all political powers
 Empress Dowager Chiêu Linh (?–1200): Empress of Emperor Lý Thần Tông. Her son was appointed as crown prince, but later he was dethroned from the seat of crown prince to a normal prince due to an event. Her husband's concubine Lady Đỗ Thụy Châu gave birth to a prince and he was appointed as crown prince later. After her husband's death, the crown prince ascended to the throne, she became empress dowager.
 Empress Dowager Đỗ Thụy Châu: After her son ascended to the throne, she became the co-empress dowager with Empress Dowager Chiêu Linh.
 Empress Dowager An Toàn (?–1226): She was famous for misusing authority during the reign of her son Emperor Lý Huệ Tông. Her daughter-in-law, Empress Trần Thị Dung joined Trần Thủ Độ plotting to overthrow the Lý dynasty and replace by Trần dynasty. Trần Thủ Độ forced her son to abdicate and be a monk at the pagoda, her son did as Trần Thủ Độ told and ceded the throne to her granddaughter Lý Chiêu Hoàng, who is the only empress of Vietnamese history, thus, she became grand empress dowager. But later Trần Thủ Độ forced Lý Chiêu Hoàng to get married with his seven-year-old nephew Trần Cảnh and ceded the throne to Trần Cảnh. At that point, An Toàn was no longer an empress dowager.
 Empress Dowager Trần Thị Dung (?–1259): She became empress dowager after her daughter Lý Chiêu Hoàng ascended to the throne. But later, Lý Chiêu Hoàng ceded the throne to her husband Trần Cảnh. Trần Thị Dung was no longer empress dowager.
 Trần dynasty
 Empress Dowager Tuyên Từ (?–1318): A concubine and younger sister-in-law of Emperor Trần Nhân Tông, she is younger sister of the proper Empress Bảo Thánh. In 1293, Emperor Trần Nhân Tông ceded the throne to his son with Empress Bảo Thánh, Trần Anh Tông, some months later her sister Grand Empress Bảo Thánh died, she became the only surviving consort of Grand Emperor Trần Nhân Tông. 1308, Grand Emperor Trần Nhân Tông died, she became empress dowager. 1314, Emperor Trần Anh Tông ceded the throne to his son Trần Minh Tông, she became grand empress dowager.
 Nguyễn dynasty
 Empress Dowager Từ Dụ (1810-1902),born Phạm Thị Hằng, was a Vietnamese empress, the wife of Emperor Thiệu Trị and mother of Emperor Tự Đức.
 Empress Dowager Từ Cung (1890-1980), mother of the last Vietnamese Emperor Bảo Đại.

See also
Consort kin
Grand empress dowager
Queen dowager and queen mother
Valide sultan of the Ottoman Empire

Notes

References

Citations

Works cited 

 Books